Minuartia is a genus of flowering plants commonly known as sandworts in the family Caryophyllaceae.

Minuartias are small annual or perennial plants which grow in otherwise inhospitable conditions such as on rocky ledges and in stony soil. The genus is widely distributed in the northern hemisphere, mainly distributed in Europe, in the Mediterranean region, and north Africa, southwest Asia, and the Caucasus Mountains.

Many Minuartia species were formerly classed in the genus Arenaria, and the obsolete genus Alsine. In 2014, the polyphyletic Minuartia sensu lato was recircumscribed, with many of the species transferred to other genera, including Cherleria, Eremogone, Facchinia, Mcneillia, Minuartiella, Mononeuria, Pseudocherleria, Rhodalsine, Sabulina, and Triplateia. Minuartia sensu stricto is characterized by the following features: leaves linear-setaceous; 5 acute sepals with 3, 5, or 9-veins; 5 white petals; 3 styles, forming 3-parted capsules.

The genus was named for Juan Minuart (1693–1768), a Spanish botanist and pharmacist.

Selected species

Minuartia arctica – Arctic sandwort
Minuartia austromontana – Columbian sandwort
Minuartia biflora – mountain sandwort
Minuartia bosniaca – Bosnian sandwort
Minuartia californica – California sandwort
Minuartia caroliniana – pinebarren sandwort
Minuartia cherlerioides
Minuartia cismontana
Minuartia cumberlandensis – Cumberland sandwort
Minuartia dawsonensis – rock sandwort
Minuartia decumbens – Lassicus sandwort
Minuartia dirphya
Minuartia douglasii – Douglas' sandwort
Minuartia drummondii – Drummond's sandwort
Minuartia elegans
Minuartia filiorum – threadbranch sandwort
Minuartia gerardii
Minuartia glabra – Appalachian sandwort
Minuartia godfreyi – Godfrey's sandwort
Minuartia graminifolia (syn. Alsine rosani)
Minuartia groenlandica – Greenland stitchwort, mountain sandwort
Minuartia howellii – Howell's sandwort
Minuartia juniperina
Minuartia krascheninnikovii
Minuartia laricifolia
Minuartia macrantha – House's sandwort
Minuartia macrocarpa – longpod sandwort
Minuartia marcescens – serpentine sandwort
Minuartia michauxii – rock sandwort
Minuartia muscorum – Dixie sandwort
Minuartia nuttallii – Nuttall's sandwort
Minuartia obtusiloba – twinflower sandwort
Minuartia patula – pitcher's sandwort
Minuartia pusilla – annual sandwort
Minuartia recurva – recurved sandwort, sickle-leaved sandwort
Minuartia rosei – peanut sandwort
Minuartia rossii – Ross' sandwort
Minuartia rubella
Minuartia sedoides – mossy cyphel; dwarf cherleria. Confined to high mountains in Europe.
Minuartia sintenisii – Troodos sandwort
Minuartia smejkalii – endemic species to the central Bohemia / Czech Republic 
Minuartia stolonifera
Minuartia stricta – bog sandwort
Minuartia tenella – slender sandwort
Minuartia uniflora
Minuartia verna – spring sandwort
Minuartia viscosa
Minuartia yukonensis – Yukon sandwort

References

 
Caryophyllaceae genera